The coat of arms of the territory of Nunavut was granted by a warrant of Roméo LeBlanc, Governor General of Canada, dated 31 March 1999, one day before the territory of Nunavut, Canada, was created. The same document specified the flag of Nunavut.

Overview 
The symbol was designed in collaboration with Inuit elders, leaders, artists, groups, and the general population of the territory. Each symbol was chosen individually from the 800 submissions for the flag and coat of arms that were received. Five draft designs were created in collaboration between the heraldic artist at the Canadian Heraldic Authority and Andrew Qappik, an Inuit artist from Pangnirtung.

The shield is blue and gold, symbolizing the riches of the land. According to the blazon, the shield should be presented on a roundel shaped shield, rather than the traditional escutcheon shape in European heraldry. In chief is a representation of the midnight sun and of the North Star, or Niqirtsuituk. Below are a qulliq, a stone lamp representing the warmth of home and community, and an inukshuk (inukhuk, inuksuk), a stone monument serving as a guidepost and a symbol of the territory.

The crest, an igloo (iglu), represents traditional life, survival, and the Nunavut government assembled in the legislature. It is ensigned with a crown representing royal sovereignty.

The supporters, a caribou and narwhal, represent sustenance and natural resources of the land and sea. They stand on a compartment with Arctic poppies, dwarf fireweed, and Arctic heather, alongside an iceberg at sea.

The motto, written in Inuktitut syllabary, is Nunavut Sannginivut (ᓄᓇᕗᑦ ᓴᙱᓂᕗᑦ,  or, Our Land, Our Strength).

The letters patent are quite unique, having been presented in English, French, Inuktitut, and Inuinnaqtun.

Blazon 
Heraldic blazon describes the coat of arms of Nunavut as:

On a circular shield: Or Dexter a qulliq Sable inflamed Gules sinister an inuksuk Azure on a chief also Azure above five bezants in arc reversed issuant from the lower chief a mullet Niqirtsuituq Or;
And for a Crest: On a wreath Argent and Azure an iglu affronty Argent windowed Or and ensigned by the Royal Crown proper;
and for a Motto: ᓄᓇᕗᑦ ᓴᙱᓂᕗᑦ, meaning "Nunavut Our Strength";
and for Supporters: On a compartment dexter of Land set with Arctic poppies, dwarf fireweed and Arctic heather proper sinister ice floes Argent set on barry wavy Azure and Argent dexter a caribou sinister a narwhal both proper.

Gallery

See also 
 Coat of arms of the Northern Territory, an Australian example of territorial arms reposing heavily on indigenous imagery
List of Canadian provincial and territorial symbols
Symbols of Nunavut

External links 

 About the Flag and Coat of Arms (Government of Nunavut)
 Creation of the Coat of Arms and Flag of Nunavut (Governor General of Canada)
 Arms and flag of Nunavut in the online Public Register of Arms, Flags and Badges

Territorial symbols of Nunavut
Nunavut
Nunavut
Nunavut
Nunavut
Nunavut
Nunavut